The Shadow of Reichenbach Falls is a 2008 mystery pastiche novel written by John R. King, that presents an alternate history of the battle between Sherlock Holmes and his nemesis Professor Moriarty.

Plot
As he tours Europe, Thomas Carnacki ends up in Meiringen, Switzerland and upon visiting Reichenbach Falls he stumbles upon Holmes and Moriarty locked in mortal combat. One man goes over the falls and as Carnacki comes to his assistance he is fired upon by the other.

The story is told in three distinct parts: the first is narrated by Carnacki, the second from the memoirs of Moriarty, and the final section by Sherlock Holmes.

Reception
Publishers Weekly described the book as "muddled" and "gimmicky". Kirkus Reviews was more positive and claimed the novel may create new fans of William Hope Hodgson's Carnacki.

See also

Sherlock Holmes: The Breath of God
 Sherlock Holmes pastiches

References

2008 novels
England in fiction
Sherlock Holmes novels
Sherlock Holmes pastiches